Tishreen Palace  is the residence for the President of Syria, located in Damascus. It is located in the Ar Rabwah neighborhood, South of Mount Qasioun. The building covers 10,000 square meters (108,000 square feet). During the Syrian civil war, there were reports that rebels fired mortars at the palace. The palace was used as the primary residence of the Assad family, until the construction of Presidential Palace on Mount Mazzeh was finished in the early 1990s.

References

Palaces in Syria
Government of Syria
Presidential residences